Greene Township may refer to one of the following places in the State of Illinois:

Greene Township, Mercer County, Illinois
Greene Township, Woodford County, Illinois

See also

Greene Township (disambiguation)

Illinois township disambiguation pages